"Torn Apart" is a song by American singer Snoop Lion, featuring British singer  Rita Ora. It was released in 2013, on his twelfth studio album, Reincarnated (2013).

Music video 
The official video was released on 1 July, 2013 on the singer's YouTube VEVO platform.

Charts

Weekly charts

References 

2013 songs
Snoop Dogg songs
Rita Ora songs
Songs written by Snoop Dogg
Songs written by Ariel Rechtshaid
Songs written by Diplo
Song recordings produced by Ariel Rechtshaid
Songs written by John Hill (record producer)
Songs written by Angela Hunte